Wagoner is a city in Wagoner County, Oklahoma, United States. The population was 8,323 at the 2010 census, compared to the figure of 7,669 recorded in 2000. It is the county seat of Wagoner County. Wagoner became the first city incorporated in Indian Territory on January 4, 1896.

History

Wagoner is along the path of the Texas Road cattle trail, and the later Jefferson Highway of the early National Trail System, both roughly along the route of U.S. Route 69 through Oklahoma today. The town began as a small community at the intersection of the Missouri-Kansas-Texas (MKT) Railway and the Kansas and Arkansas Valley Railway (later the Missouri Pacific Railway), when William McAnally, a foreman for the MKT built a small hotel at this isolated location in June 1887. By the next summer others had built two more hotels and two general stores. The town was named for railroad dispatcher Henry "Big Foot" Wagoner, who had reported the need for a railroad switch nearby to accommodate the shipment of logs and hay. The switch had been previously named "Wagoner's Switch." The switch soon relocated to the town and caused the development of a major cattle shipping business.

By 1894, the community had 642 names in a local census. A local newspaper began promoting the town in 1895, encouraging more people to move to there. By 1896, there were approximately 1,500 residents. In the fall of 1895, the community formed a commission that circulated a petition requesting incorporation under the statutes of Arkansas. Incorporation was granted by the U. S. District Court on January 4, 1896, making Wagoner the first city incorporated in Indian Territory.

A privately funded courthouse was built in 1897, which housed a newly created U. S. Western District Court. The Dawes Commission turned Indian Territory land from tribal to individual ownership by members of each tribe. The individuals were allowed to sell their land to non-Indians, causing a real estate boom in farmland around the area. By statehood, the city had 2,950 residents and was named as the county seat of Wagoner County.

In April 1914 Wagoner was the location of a brutal lynching of a 17 year old African American girl.

The boom continued through 1910, when the population reached 4,018. The MKT had located a division headquarters in the city, which then had three railroad trunk lines and twenty passenger trains a day. Industries included three grain elevators, a cotton gin, cotton oil mill, iron foundry, hardwood company, cement plant, and roller mill. However, the boom ended in 1913, when the MKT moved its division headquarters to Muskogee. The oil boom farther west and later, the Great Depression, caused a further decline in the city's economy and population.

World War II started a revival of Wagoner's fortunes. The city lay between two war-related Federal Government projects: Camp Gruber to the south and the Oklahoma Ordnance Works to the north.

After the war, several small manufacturing industries took root. Completion of the nearby Fort Gibson Lake in 1950 stimulated the economy and turned Wagoner into a sports and retirement center. The McLellan-Kerr navigational channel made the agricultural area accessible by barges, stimulating farm-related businesses. Highway improvements made Wagoner a bedroom community for Tulsa and Muskogee.

Geography
Wagoner is located at  (35.955501, -95.377938).

Demographics
As of the census of 2000, there were 7,669 people, 2,928 households, and 2,111 families residing in the city. The population density was 1,101.4 people per square mile (425.4/km). There were 3,152 housing units at an average density of 452.7 per square mile (174.9/km). The racial makeup of the city was 70.48% White, 9.27% African American, 13.21% Native American, 0.34% Asian, 0.08% Pacific Islander, 0.70% from other races, and 5.92% from two or more races. Hispanic or Latino of any race were 1.93% of the population.

There were 2,928 households, out of which 35.6% had children under the age of 18 living with them, 52.3% were married couples living together, 15.6% had a female householder with no husband present, and 27.9% were non-families. 25.1% of all households were made up of individuals, and 13.1% had someone living alone who was 65 years of age or older. The average household size was 2.58 and the average family size was 3.06.

In the city, the population was spread out, with 28.1% under the age of 18, 9.9% from 18 to 24, 26.3% from 25 to 44, 21.0% from 45 to 64, and 14.7% who were 65 years of age or older. The median age was 35 years. For every 100 females, there were 88.7 males. For every 100 females age 18 and over, there were 84.7 males.

The median income for a household in the city was $30,493, and the median income for a family was $35,426. Males had a median income of $28,163 versus $21,331 for females. The per capita income for the city was $14,178. About 12.2% of families and 15.5% of the population were below the poverty line, including 20.2% of those under age 18 and 14.5% of those age 65 or over.

Media
Wagoner has one newspaper, the American-Tribune. The paper is published every Wednesday. It was owned by Community Publishers, a newspaper and Internet publisher and commercial printer that serves Oklahoma, Missouri, and Arkansas.
On Tuesday, April 21, 2015, The Tulsa World announced that its parent company BH Media, a division of Berkshire Hathaway, the Omaha-based investment holding company led by billionaire Warren Buffett had purchased several suburban newspapers, including the Wagoner Tribune.

Government
Wagoner uses a city council consisting of eight members and the mayor. As of April 2020, the current mayor is Albert Jones.

Transportation

Highways
Wagoner is served by US-69, SH-51, and SH-16, and has easy access to the Muskogee Turnpike, also known as 
SH-351, providing a direct route to Tulsa.

Airports
Hefner-Easley Airport (FAA Identifier—H68), owned by the City of Wagoner, is two miles directly east.  Commercial flights go in and out of Tulsa International Airport, about a 45-minute drive to the northwest.

Railroads
The town has freight service from the Union Pacific, being at the intersection of the old Katy and Missouri Pacific lines now both owned by Union Pacific.  Union Pacific honors Wagoner as a “Train Town USA,” one of 131 communities out of 7,300 communities it serves, because of the town's unique, long-standing relationship with the railroad.

Notable people
 Bob Bogle (1934-2009), a founding member of The Ventures
 Isabel Cobb (1858-1947), first woman physician in Indian territory.
 Shelby Grant (1937-2011), actress.
 Willis Hudlin (1906-2002), major league baseball pitcher.
 Albert C. Hunt (1888-1956), politician, attorney, served as Wagoner City Attorney 1909–1959; later became Justice of Oklahoma Supreme Court
 Bobby Lane (born 1939), American football player
 Thomas Sleeper, (b. 1956) conductor and composer
Bob Cobb, a bass player in the Western swing movement made famous by Bob Wills and his Texas Playboys. Cobb has received many accolades and is a member of the Western Swing Hall of Fame.
Tommy Biffle, a professional bass fisherman, resides on the shores on nearby Lake Fort Gibson. Biffle has accumulated over $1.5 million in tournament earnings over his 21-year fishing career.

 Malcolm Rodriguez (born 1999), American football player

See also
Wagoner High School
Destiny Christian Academy
Wagoner Armory
Cobb Building

References

External links
 Wagoner Chamber of Commerce
 Wagoner Public Library
 Wagoner Public Schools

Cities in Wagoner County, Oklahoma
Cities in Oklahoma
County seats in Oklahoma
Tulsa metropolitan area
1887 establishments in Indian Territory